Guerrero Maya Jr. (Spanish for "Maya Warrior Junior", born August 8, 1985) is a Mexican luchador enmascarado (or masked professional wrestler), currently working for the Mexican professional wrestling promotion Consejo Mundial de Lucha Libre (CMLL). He portrays a tecnico ("Good guy") wrestling character. Guerrero Maya Jr.'s real name is not a matter of public record, as is often the case with masked wrestlers in Mexico where their private lives are kept a secret from the wrestling fans. He is the son of Esteban Mares Castañeda, better known under the ring names Black Terry and Guerrero Maya. He has previously competed as the enmascarado characters Samba and Multifacético (the third person to use that name).

Personal life
The man known under the ring name Guerrero Maya Jr. earned a degree in Business Administration from a European University before his professional wrestling career, noting that it was important to him to have a well rounded background, to combine intellect with skill. Maya Jr. does a lot of charity work through his employer Consejo Mundial de Lucha Libre (CMLL), including visiting sick children at various hospitals around Mexico, stating that he appreciates his career giving him opportunities like that. In late 2010 Guerrero Maya Jr. contracted Hepatitis A, but was able to fully recover after a month away from the ring, returning to active competition on February 1, 2011. It was not until his debut in CMLL that it was revealed that Guerrero Maya Jr. was the son of Esteban Mares Castañeda, who is better known under the ring names Black Terry and Guerrero Maya as they revealed that he was the son of "Guerrero Maya".

Professional wrestling career
He made his professional wrestling debut in 2005, working as the enmascarado (masked) character Samba. He had been trained for his professional wrestling career by El Reo, El Dandy and Black Terry, and would receive additional training from El Satánico and Franco Colombo once he began working for CMLL. As Samba he worked mainly on the Mexican Independent circuit in Mexico State, although he made a low card debut for International Wrestling Revolution Group (IWRG) wrestling promotion in early 2007.

Multifacético (2007–2009)
In late 2007 he was given a new ring name and mask and became Multifacético ("Multi-faceted"), the third wrestler to actually use the name and mask in IWRG. As Multifacético he worked as a tecnico (the Spanish term for a wrestler who portrays a "good guy" character) and had a lot of promotional support behind him. The heavy focus on the inexperienced, and at times accident prone Multifacético saw the fans react in the opposite way, booing him instead of supporting him. With time his in-ring skills improved and his long running feud with Black Terry eventually showed that he had wrestling skills and the two put on some of the best IWRG matches in 2008 according to Súper Luchas Magazine. During the storyline between the two Multifacético defeated Black Terry to win the IWRG Intercontinental Welterweight Championship, holding it for 67 days before losing it to Fuerza Guerrera on May 29, 2008. As part of his promotional push as a top star Multifacético won a rapid succession of Luchas de Apuestas ("Bet matches"), where his opponent was forced to have his hair shaved off after the loss. Between February 17 and April 17 Multifacético defeated Kaminari, Cyborg and Black Terry in Luchas de Apuestas matches. Multifacético competed in IWRG's 2008 Rey del Ring ("King of the Ring") tournament, a 30-man elimination tournament where he was the second to last man eliminated by eventual winner Scorpio Jr.

Guerrero Maya Jr. (2009–present)
The Multifacético stopped appearing on IWRG shows in early 2009 with no explanation for the disappearance. A few months later CMLL announced that the son of retired enmascarado Guerrero Maya was joining CMLL, using the ring name Guerrero Maya Jr. This announcement was the first official confirmation that the former Multifacético was actually the son of Black Terry, since Black Terry played the Guerrero Maya character. Guerrero Maya Jr. made his in-ring debut on May 31, 2009 alongside a number of other new wrestlers signed to CMLL. Of the group of wrestlers he started with, which included Hijo del Sicodelico, As Jr. and Rene Guarjardo Jr. he was the only one who remained with CMLL for long. Initially he wore an aquamarine and black mask and full body suit. He would later change his color scheme and mask design to a black base with green, pink and blue colors, including a visible "M" logo reminiscent of the Multifacético mask.

After working lower card matches through 2009 and into 2010 Guerrero Maya Jr. received his first major opportunity in April, 2010 when he was entered into the 2010 Gran Alternativa tournament, a tournament that pairs up a rookie and a veteran for a tag team competition. Maya Jr. teamed up with Valiente for the tournament but lost to the team of lost to Raziel and Averno in the first round. For about a year Guerrero Maya Jr. continued to work mid-card matches, gaining experience as he kept training at CMLL's wrestling school. In 2011 he once again competed in that year's Gran Alternativa, this time teaming with Máximo, but was no more successful than his 2010 entry as the team lost to Negro Casas and Puma King in the first round. Following the Gran Alternativa tournament Guerrero Maya Jr. was entered in CMLL's Forjando un Ídolo ("Forging an Idol") tournament along with a number of other young wrestlers, all trying to make a name for themselves. Guerrero Maya Jr. defeated Metal Blanco, but lost to Dragon Lee. and Delta, due to fan voting Maya earned an additional point, forcing a tie between himself and Metal Blanco for who would advance. Guerrero Maya Jr. defeated Metal Blanco in the tiebreaker match, moving on to the second round. Guerrero Maya Jr. lost in the first round of the second round to eventual tournament winner Ángel de Oro. 2011 was the year Guerrero Maya Jr. started to move up the ranks of CMLL, competing in various tournaments, including a tournament for the vacant CMLL World Super Lightweight Championship, making it all the way to the finale of the tournament before being defeated by Virus. CMLL held another tournament in June, 2011 a continuation of the Forjándo un Ídolo tournament called Forjándo un Ídolo:La guerra continúa ("Forging an Idol: the war continues") where the top two wrestlers in each group teamed with their trainer for a trios tournament. Guerrero Maya Jr.'s trainer Shocker was injured and this had to be replaced with Atlantis and was joined by Delta. The three defeated Negro Casas, Diamante and Hijo del Signo to win the tournament. Guerrero Maya Jr. was injured during the semi final match, but worked through it to win the final, but then had to take a couple of months off to recover from his shoulder injury.

Los Reyes de la Atlantida

On November 16, Atlantis announced that he was officially forming a stable named Los Reyes de la Atlantida ("The Kings of the Atlantis") with Delta and Guerrero Maya Jr. During the press conference to announce the new group the announcement was interrupted by Shocker, angry that his team had turned to Atlantis instead of him and introduced his own trio, consisting of himself and two new characters Titán and Tritón. The storyline with Los Reyes was dropped only a few weeks later, when Shocker was taken off the shows for personal reasons. On December 16, Los Reyes de la Atlantida defeated Los Invasores (Olímpico, Psicosis II and Volador Jr.) to win the Mexican National Trios Championship at CMLL's Sin Piedad show. In early 2012 Guerrero Maya Jr. competed in his first Torneo Nacional de Parejas Increibles, teaming up with rudo ("Bad guy") Euforia but lost in the first round to the team of Máscara Dorada and Volador Jr. On June 22, 2012 Los Reyes de la Atlantida lost the title to Los Depredadores del Aire (Black Warrior, Mr. Águila and Volador Jr.). On October 30, Los Reyes de la Atlantida regained the Mexican National Trios Championship from Los Depredadores del Aire. They lost the title to the Los Invasores team of Kraneo, Mr. Águila and Psicosis II on December 16, 2012. A few days later, on December 25, 2012 Guerrero Maya Jr. unsuccessfully challenged Negro Casas for the NWA Historic Welterweight Championship on a Christmas show in Arena Mexico after defeating Casas in a series of matches leading up to the show. In early 2013 Guerrero Maya Jr. and Negro Casas were teamed up for the 2013 CMLL Torneo Nacional de Parejas Increibles, a tournament where the concept was that rivals or at least wrestlers from opposite sides of the tecnico/rudo divide. The team lost in the first round to eventual tournament winners La Sombra and Volador Jr. In March, 2013 Guerrero Maya Jr. was announced as participating in the 2013 En Busca de un Ídolo ("In search of an Idol") tournament. When the official details of the tournament was revealed in early May, Guerrero Maya Jr. had been removed as a competitor. On November 3, Maya and Delta defeated La Fiebre Amarilla (Namajague and Okumura) to win the CMLL Arena Coliseo Tag Team Championship. On February 9, 2014, Maya and Delta defended CMLL Arena Coliseo Tag Team Championship against Tiger and Puma King. Guerrero Maya Jr.'s reign with the Arena Coliseo Tag Team Championship ended over 400 days later when the team lost to La Comando Caribeño ("The Caribbean Commando"; Misterioso Jr. and Sagrado) on February 28, 2015. On April 26, 2015, Los Reyes de la Atlantida won the Mexican National Trios Championship for a record-breaking third time by defeating La Peste Negra (El Felino, Mr. Niebla and Negro Casas).

In May, 2015 Guerrero Maya Jr. competed in a qualifying match for the 2015 version of En Busca de un Ídolo with as one of 16 wrestlers in the qualifying torneo cibernetico, elimination match where the last eight wrestlers would qualify for the tournament. He competed against Akuma, Blue Panther Jr., Cancerbero, Canelo Casas, Delta, Disturbio, Esfinge, Flyer, El Gallo, Joker, Pegasso, Raziel, Sagrado, Stigma and Boby Zavala. He eliminated Raziel and was one of the survivors to qualify for the main portion of the tournament. Maya Jr. earned 100 points out of a possible 140 points by winning 5 matches, losing only to Boby Zavala and Esfinge. Maya Jr. also scored favorable points from the judges, El Tirantes, El Hijo del Gladiador, Shocker and a rotating judge, earning a total of 213 points, an average of 7.6, the second highest of the first round. With 225 points from the fan polls Guerrero Maya Jr. ended up in first place after the first round with a total of 538 points, thus qualifying for the second round of the tournament. In the finals Guerrero Maya Jr. lost to Bobby Zavala. On December 19, 2015 Guerrero Maya Jr, teaming with The Panther regained the CMLL Arena Coliseo Tag Team Championship from La Comando Caribeño, making Guerrero Maya Jr. the first wrestler in the modern age to win that championship twice. In January 2016, Guerrero Maya Jr. made his Japanese debut by taking part in the CMLL and New Japan Pro-Wrestling (NJPW) co-produced Fantastica Mania 2016 tour. On the fifth show of the tour, he and The Panther successfully defended the Arena Coliseo Tag Team Championship against Boby Z and Okumura. On December 25, 2016 Guerrero Maya Jr and  The Panther lost the title against Black Terry and Negro Navarro, two independent wrestlers who do not work for CMLL, the match took place at the Lucha Memes show "Chairo 7: Hell In a Christmas Cell", a non-CMLL show.

U.S. appearances
Guerrero Maya Jr. and Stuka Jr. represented CMLL at the 2019 Crockett Cup tournament on April 27, 2019 in Concord, North Carolina. The duo lost to Royce Isaacs and Thomas Latimer in the first round of the tournament to be eliminated.

Championships and accomplishments
Consejo Mundial de Lucha Libre
CMLL Arena Coliseo Tag Team Championship (2 times) – with Delta, with The Panther
Mexican National Trios Championship (3 times) – with Atlantis and Delta
Forjando un Ídolo: Guerra Continúa (2011) – with Atlantis and Delta
International Wrestling Revolution Group
IWRG Intercontinental Welterweight Championship (1 time)

Luchas de Apuestas record

Notes

References

1985 births
Mexican male professional wrestlers
Living people
Masked wrestlers
Professional wrestlers from Puebla
People from Atlixco
Unidentified wrestlers
21st-century professional wrestlers
Mexican National Trios Champions